Rakesh Singha (born 8 December 1956) is an Indian communist politician and a former member of the Himachal Pradesh Legislative Assembly representing the Communist Party of India (Marxist).

Career 
Singha was first elected in 1993 as member of the legislative assembly (MLA) representing the Shimla constituency. However, he was disqualified from holding his seat following a decision of the Supreme Court which upheld his 1987 conviction for involvement in a murder case from 1978 during his time as a student.

He came on third position in the 2012 Himachal Pradesh Legislative Assembly election from Theog.

In 2017, Singha was reelected from the Theog constituency to the Legislative Assembly because of his huge support base of communist student movement and trade union .CPIM has huge followers in Shimla corporation area in the state.HP.Singha is a Member of the Central Committee of the CPI(M) in Himachal Pradesh. However in 2022 Himachal Pradesh Legislative Assembly election, he was defeated by Indian National Congress's Kuldeep Singh Rathore.

Electoral performance

References 

People from Shimla
Communist Party of India (Marxist) politicians
Living people
21st-century Indian politicians
1956 births
Himachal Pradesh MLAs 1993–1998
Himachal Pradesh MLAs 2017–2022